Natalia Oleksandrivna Godunko (born 5 December 1984) is a Ukrainian former rhythmic gymnast. She is the 2001 team all-around world champion, 2005 European ribbon champion and the 2004 Grand Prix Final all-around champion.

Personal life 
Godunko was born in Kyiv, in the Ukrainian SSR of the Soviet Union (in present-day Ukraine).

Godunko online auctioned her Team All-Around gold medal won in the 2001 World Rhythmic Gymnastics Championships to support the Ukrainian army who at the time was fighting a war in Donbass.

Career

Junior 
Godunko started training in rhythmic gymnastics in 1990 at age six. She trained in Kyiv under the mother/daughter coaching team of Albina and Irina Deriugina. Her coaches did not notice her for a while—she was not tall with long legs, which was preferred by the Deriugins School—but her speed and technique with apparatus and on elements eventually attracted their attention.

In 1998, Godunko became a member of the Ukrainian national team and competed as a junior at the World Youth Games in Moscow, placing sixth.

Senior 
As a senior, Godunko competed as part of the Ukrainian group for several years, as well as occasionally competing in individual events with little success. With the Ukrainian group, she won the 2001 World Championship team all-around and the five ribbons gold medal at the 2022 World Championships. She was the third-ranked gymnast in Ukraine for a while. She began her breakthrough at the 2002 Ukrainian Nationals, winning bronze in all-round and all gold medals in the finals. In 2003, she competed in ball at her first Grand Prix, the Deriugina Cup, and then competed in hoop and ribbon at the Holon Grand Prix and in ribbon at the Berlin Grand Prix. She won the bronze all-around medal at the 2003 Grand Prix Final in Innsbruck, Austria.

At the 2004 Athens Olympics, Godunko qualified in fourth with a score of 102.750. In the final, she scored: ribbon 26.125, clubs 26.375, ball 25.800, hoop 25.500, and finished fifth overall behind Kazakh gymnast Aliya Yussupova. She won the 2004 Grand Prix Final in all-around and won two more gold medals in ball and ribbon.

In 2005, Godunko was a rival to Anna Bessonova for the position of Ukraine's top gymnast. In front of a home audience, Godunko won the Deriugina Cup title. She was the only Ukrainian to win a gold medal, in ribbon, at the 2005 European Championships. At the 2005 World Championships, Godunko won team silver and ribbon bronze.

In 2006, Godunko won gold in rope, silver in ribbon and bronze in clubs at the Mie World Cup. She won bronze in hoop at the Benidorm World Cup. At the Berlin Grand Prix she won bronzes in ball, clubs and ribbon.

In 2007, she won team silver at the European Championships, as well as ball silver and rope bronze at the Summer Universiade.

At the 2008 Summer Olympics, Godunko finished seventh in the all-around finals with an overall score of 68.850 points. 

She briefly returned to competition in 2010, competing at the 2010 World Championships where she finished 18th all-around.

Routine music information

Detailed Olympic results

References

External links
 
 
 

1984 births
Living people
Ukrainian rhythmic gymnasts
Gymnasts at the 2004 Summer Olympics
Gymnasts at the 2008 Summer Olympics
Deriugins Gymnasts
Gymnasts from Kyiv
Olympic gymnasts of Ukraine
Medalists at the Rhythmic Gymnastics World Championships
Medalists at the Rhythmic Gymnastics European Championships
World Games silver medalists
World Games bronze medalists
Universiade medalists in gymnastics
Competitors at the 2005 World Games
Universiade gold medalists for Ukraine
Universiade silver medalists for Ukraine
Universiade bronze medalists for Ukraine